The Women's 500 m time trial took place at 5 October 2010 at the Indira Gandhi Arena.

Results

External links
 Reports

Track cycling at the 2010 Commonwealth Games
Cycling at the Commonwealth Games – Women's 500 m time trial
Comm